LDL is a low-density lipoprotein, one of the five major groups of lipoproteins.

LDL or LdL may also refer to:

 Learning by teaching (German: Lernen durch Lehren, LdL), whereby students learn by themselves teaching
 Loudness discomfort level in hyperacusis
 LDL decomposition, Cholesky decomposition in linear algebra